Meskerem was a communist theoretical publication published in Ethiopia, issued by the Ideological Department of the Central Committee of the Commission for Organizing the Party of the Working People of Ethiopia. The goal of Meskerem was to relate Marxist-Leninist theory to objective conditions in Ethiopia. Meskerem functioned mainly as an instrument for political education. Amha Dagnew was the editor-in-chief of Meskerem.

Meskerem was published quarterly. The first issue of Meskerem was published in September 1980 and the last issue (vol. 3, no. 14) was published in June 1983. Meskerem, which appeared in both Amharic and English versions, had a circulation of 100,000.

References

External links 
 “መስከረም” — some issues of the Amharic-language edition of the journal “መስከረም” (“Meskerem”).

1980 establishments in Ethiopia
1983 disestablishments in Ethiopia
Communism in Ethiopia
Communist magazines
Defunct magazines published in Ethiopia
Defunct political magazines
Magazines established in 1980
Magazines disestablished in 1983
Quarterly magazines